Lutz Liwowski (born 30 July 1967) is a German sprint canoeist, born in Düsseldorf, who competed from the mid-1990s to the early 2000s (decade). He won five medals at the ICF Canoe Sprint World Championships with two golds (K-1 1000 m: 1998, 1999) and three bronzes (K-1 500 m: 1998, K-1 1000 m: 1995, 2001).

Liwowski also competed in two Summer Olympics, earning his best finish of fourth in the K-1 1000 m event at Atlanta in 1996.

References

1967 births
Sportspeople from Düsseldorf
Canoeists at the 1996 Summer Olympics
Canoeists at the 2000 Summer Olympics
German male canoeists
Living people
Olympic canoeists of Germany
ICF Canoe Sprint World Championships medalists in kayak